Edward "Ted" Naifeh is an American comic book writer and artist known for his illustrations in the goth romance comic Gloomcookie. Naifeh has since become most known as the creator of the Eisner-Award-nominated series Courtney Crumrin, published by Oni Press.

Other works by Naifeh include How Loathsome, which he co-created with Tristan Crane; the comic adaptation of the PSP game Death, Jr. (written by Gary Whitta); three issues of the comic adaptation of Gene Wolfe's The Shadow of the Torturer, Seven Seas Entertainment's Unearthly; and the Oni Press series Polly and the Pirates. Naifeh also provided illustrations for Caitlín R. Kiernan's short-fiction collection, Alabaster. Ted is currently illustrating Good Neighbors, a trilogy of graphic novels written by Holly Black and published through Scholastic.

Naifeh has illustrated cards for the Magic: The Gathering collectible card game.

References

External links

 
 

1971 births
American comics artists
American comics writers
Game artists
Living people
Place of birth missing (living people)
American people of Iranian descent